"Dreamin'" ("Dreaming" in US) is a song recorded by Cliff Richard from his 1980 album, I'm No Hero. The track was the first of three singles released and was the biggest hit from the album, becoming a top-ten hit in numerous countries including the UK and the US. It became his third and last top ten hit.

Release and reception 
"Dreamin'" was composed by Alan Tarney with lyrics by Leo Sayer, whose own hit, a cover of "More Than I Can Say", was on the charts concurrently with "Dreaming" during the last four months of 1980. When recording the song, Richard was concerned that it was pitched too high for his range. However, Tarney told him "it was fantastic and asked [him] to try to sing it in this key".

It was released with the B-side being a re-recording of "Dynamite", a song Richard had originally recorded with the Shadows in 1959 and released as the B-side to their number-one hit "Travellin' Light". The re-recording was later included on Richard's 1984 album The Rock Connection due to a lack of material for that album.

Reviewing for Record Mirror, Robin Smith wrote "Golden toed and tonsilled Cliff takes a snort of Ginseng and mounts yet another winner. Smooth as a koala bear's bum in summer and with the same listenable capacity as 'We Don't Talk Anymore', The man who makes the EMI accounts department very happy, looks set for another decade".

The release of the follow-up single from Richard's I'm No Hero album, "A Little in Love" was delayed by the release of his duet with Olivia Newton-John "Suddenly", from the Xanadu soundtrack.

Track listing 
7": EMI / EMI 5095
 "Dreamin'" – 3:38
 "Dynamite" – 3:12

Personnel 
 Cliff Richard – vocals, backing vocals
 Alan Tarney – bass, backing vocals
 Michael Boddicker – synthesiser
 Nick Glennie-Smith – synthesiser
 Trevor Spencer – drums

Charts and certifications

Weekly charts

Year-end charts

Certifications

References

1980 songs
1980 singles
Cliff Richard songs
Songs written by Alan Tarney
Songs written by Leo Sayer
Song recordings produced by Alan Tarney
EMI Records singles
British songs
Songs about dreams